The 2020 New York City FC season was the club's sixth season of competition and its sixth in the top tier of American soccer, Major League Soccer. New York City FC usually played its home games at Yankee Stadium in the New York City borough of The Bronx.
 However, the 2020 MLS season saw the club play several of their home games at Red Bull Arena in Harrison, New Jersey due to scheduling conflicts at both Yankee Stadium and Citi Field as well as winterization procedures during the 2020 CONCACAF Champions League which were unavoidable.

The club's season began on February 20, 2020 with their CONCACAF Champions League fixture against San Carlos.

Player movement

In 
Per Major League Soccer and club policies, terms of the deals do not get disclosed.

Out 

Per Major League Soccer and club policies, terms of the deals do not get disclosed.

Current roster

Included the caps in the 2 games of the knockout stage in the "MLS is Back Tournament".

Competitions

Preseason

MLS

League tables

Eastern Conference

Overall

Match results

MLS Cup Playoffs

U.S. Open Cup 

Due to their final standings for the 2019 season, the NYCFC were scheduled to enter the competition in the Fourth Round, to be played May 19–20. The ongoing coronavirus pandemic, however, forced the U.S. Soccer Federation to cancel the tournament on August 17, 2020.

CONCACAF Champions League

Round of 16

Quarter-finals

MLS is Back Tournament

Group A

Knockout stage

Statistics

Appearances and goals 
Last updated on November 21, 2020
 (Only the 3 games of the "MLS is Back Tournament", also valid for the MLS regular season, are considered).

|-
! colspan=14 style=background:#dcdcdc; text-align:center|Goalkeepers

|-
! colspan=14 style=background:#dcdcdc; text-align:center|Defenders

|-
! colspan=14 style=background:#dcdcdc; text-align:center|Midfielders

|-
! colspan=14 style=background:#dcdcdc; text-align:center|Forwards

|-
! colspan=14 style=background:#dcdcdc; text-align:center| Players who have made an appearance or had a squad number this season but have left the club
|}

Notes

References

New York City FC
New York City FC
New York City FC seasons
New York City FC
New York City FC